Leziate, Sugar and Derby Fens is an  biological Site of Special Scientific Interest  east of King's Lynn in  Norfolk.

These fens have extensive heaths and areas of wet acidic grassland, and there are smaller areas of damp woodland and species-rich calcareous grassland. There are many ant-hills on Derby Fen.

There is public access to the fens, which are in three separate areas.

References

Sites of Special Scientific Interest in Norfolk